This is a list of architectural historians.
The names are grouped by order of the historical period in which they were writing, which is not necessarily the same as the period in which they specialize.

Born in the 19th century
 James Fergusson (architect) (1808–1886), South Asian Architecture.
  Sir Alexander Cunningham (1814–1893), Indian architecture.
 Sir Banister Fletcher (1866–1953), author of the once-standard textbook A History of Architecture on the Comparative Method written with his father, also named Bannister Fletcher (1833–1899) and still in print.
 Juan Giuria (1880–1957), history of South American architecture

Born in the 20th century
 James S. Ackerman (1920–2016), Italian Renaissance architecture
 Stanford Anderson (1934–2016), modern architecture
 Leopoldo C. Artucio (1903–1976), modern architecture in Uruguay
 Soumyen Bandyopadhyay, architecture of Oman.
 Reyner Banham (1922–1988), taught by Pevsner and author of Theory and Design in the First Machine Age (1960).
 Leonardo Benevolo (1923–2017), twentieth-century architecture
 Karen Burns (born 1962), historian of nineteenth-century architecture and twentieth-century architecture
 Graeme Butler, architectural historian and heritage practitioner
 William J. R. Curtis (born 1948), twentieth-century architecture
 Harriet Edquist twentieth-century architecture
 Kenneth Frampton (born 1930), twentieth-century architecture
 Adam Hardy (born 1953), South Asian architecture.
 Ahmed Hasan Dani (1920–2009), South Asian Architecture.
 John Harvey (1911–1997), English Gothic architecture and architects. 
 Jonathan Hill, Professor of Architecture and Visual Theory at University College London, England.
 Mark Jarzombek (born 1954) Professor of the history and theory of architecture, Massachusetts Institute of Technology.
 James Semple Kerr (1932–2014), Australian conservation architect and author of The Conservation Plan.
 Miles Ballantyne Lewis (born 1943) Australian academic specialising in building materials.
 Liang Sicheng (1901–1972), father of Chinese architectural history.
 Lin Huiyin (1904–1955), Chinese architectural history.
 Liu Xianjue (1931–2019), Chinese architectural history and architectural heritage of Macau.
 César J. Loustau (1926–2011), architecture in Uruguay in the 19th and 20th centuries.
 Aurelio Lucchini (died 1989), Uruguayan architecture.
 Michael W. Meister, temple architecture and the morphology of meaning of the Indian sub-continent.
 Nikolaus Pevsner (1902–1983), author of the 46-volume series, The Buildings of England.
 Herbert Ricke (1901–1976), head of the Swiss research institute on Egyptian architecture and archaeology in Cairo, specialist of ancient Egyptian architecture.
 Sarasi Kumar Saraswati (1906–1980), Bangladeshi historian of art and architecture.
 John Summerson (1904–1992), author of The Classical Language of Architecture and Architecture in Britain: 1530-1830.
 Jennifer Taylor (1935–2015), Australian, Japanese and South Pacific architecture
 Robert Jan van Pelt (born 1955), Dutch-Canadian author, Holocaust scholar and Professor of Cultural History at the University of Waterloo, Canada.
 Michael D. Willis (born 1951), early temple architecture of central India.
 Yang Hongxun (1931–2016), Chinese architectural history and archaeology.
 Charles Janckes (1939-2019), Postmodern Architecture.

See also
Historiography
History
Historian
Outline of architecture

References 

Lists of people by occupation
Lists of historians